Silver Lake is a lake in Grand Traverse County, Michigan. The lake is known for its pine coasts, irregular shoreline, and many peninsulas and islands, despite being smaller in size. It is also the fourth-largest lake entirely within Grand Traverse County, after Long Lake, Green Lake, and Duck Lake.

History 
Silver Lake was originally named Lake Kratochvil, after the small nearby town called Kratochvil's Plat (which is now a ghost town), itself named after Frank Kratochvil, a local settler. Frank's daughter, Anna, was the mother of W.D.C. Germaine, mayor of nearby Traverse City. The lake was later named Silver Lake.

Until sometime in the early 1900s, Blair Township was known as "Silver Lake Township".

In 1965, the Silver Lake Improvement Association was established to promote the care and preservation of Silver Lake.

In 1987, the Grand Traverse County Drain Commission installed a high water outflow dam at the southern end of the lake.

Recreation 
Silver Lake is a local hotspot for fishing. It is known for its Bass, Bluegill, Perch, Pike, Lake sunfish, and Walleye. There is a public dock used for launching boats on the eastern shore of the lake. The Silver Lake Recreation Area is a park for people of all ages, and is located northeast of the lake. Holiday Park Campground is a large private campground on the southern end of the lake, just off of US 31. It has boat access and has RV camping lots surrounding the lake. Annually, there are regattas and fishing competitions on the lake.

The lake is popular in winter with ice fishers.

See also
List of lakes in Michigan

References

External links
 Silver Lake from above
 Holiday Park Campground Website

Lakes of Michigan
Lakes of Grand Traverse County, Michigan